Clarena Brockie (born 1949, in Havre, Montana) was a Democratic member of the Montana House of Representatives who represents the 32nd District. She defeated former Representative Tony Belcourt by three votes, 371 to 368, in the 2012 election. She was defeated in 2014 by Bruce Meyers.

Brockie received a Bachelor's degree from Northern Montana College (now Montana State University–Northern) and a Master's degree from the University of Arizona. She resides in Hays, Montana, on the Fort Belknap Indian Reservation, and serves as Dean of Student Affairs at Aaniiih Nakoda College.

References

External links
Official legislative webpage

Living people
Democratic Party members of the Montana House of Representatives
Women state legislators in Montana
Native American state legislators in Montana
Native American women in politics
Montana State University–Northern alumni
People from Phillips County, Montana
1949 births
People from Havre, Montana
People from Blaine County, Montana
People from Fort Belknap Indian Reservation
21st-century American women